Mal-e Gavdan (also Romanized as Mal-e Gāvdān, Malegāydān, and Mal Gāv Dān) is a village in Markazi Rural District, in the Central District of Dashti County, Bushehr Province, Iran. At the 2006 census, its population was 134, in 33 families.

References 

Populated places in Dashti County